Han Kwang-sang is a North Korean politician. He is a member of the Central Committee of the Workers' Party of Korea.

Biography
In 2014 he was elected to the 13th convocation of the Supreme People's Assembly, representing the 91st (Tongmyon) electoral district. In accordance with the decision of the 7th Congress of the Workers' Party of Korea he was elected an alternate (candidate) member of the 7th Central Committee of WPK. In December 2018 he was reported to head the Finance and Accounting Department of the Workers' Party of Korea.

References

Workers' Party of Korea politicians
Members of the Supreme People's Assembly